Edwin Reyes may refer to:

 Edwin Reyes, American politician
 Edwin Reyes, Gibraltarian MP (Gibraltar Social Democrats)